3121 (pronounced "thirty-one twenty-one") is the thirty-first studio album by American musician Prince. It was released on March 21, 2006 (or, on 3/21). 3121 was released by NPG Records and distributed, under a "one-album deal", by Universal Music.

3121 reinforced Prince's big comeback after the critical success of Musicology (2004). It is the only Prince album ever to debut at number one (during his lifetime) on the Billboard 200, with over 180,000 copies sold in its first week. It knocked the soundtrack for High School Musical off the top spot, and became Prince's first number one album since Batman in 1989. Eventually it was certified Gold by the Recording Industry Association of America (RIAA).

Album information
The album's first single, "Te Amo Corazón", was released in the United States on December 13, 2005; the second single, "Black Sweat", was released on February 2, 2006. The record is one of the first to utilize the autotune effect.

The album title refers to Prince's rental home at 3121 Antelo Rd, Los Angeles.    Later homes rented by Prince were colloquially referred to as "3121", including a home owned by professional basketball player Carlos Boozer.

Album sessions started in November 2004 with the recording of the song "3121" at Paisley Park with Michael Bland and Sonny T.

A limited number of albums included "purple tickets," whose finders were flown in from Europe, Asia, Mexico and the US to attend a semi-private performance (along with a long list of celebrities) at Prince's home in Los Angeles.

Tickets for the Earth tour in 2007 in London's O2 arena were  priced at £31.21, echoing the title of this album.

Track listing

Personnel
Michael Bland (on "3121"), Cora Coleman Dunham (on "Te Amo Corazón," "Get On the Boat") – drums
Sonny T (on "3121"), Joshua Dunham (on "Te Amo Corazón," "Get On the Boat") – bass
Maceo Parker, Candy Dulfer, Greg Boyer and Ray – horn section
Herbert Urena, Ricky Salas (on "Te Amo Corazón"), Sheila E. (on "Get On the Boat") – percussion
Clare Fischer – string arrangements
The New Power Generation (shouts), Támar (and co-lead on "Beautiful, Loved and Blessed") – additional and backing vocals
Prince – all other instruments and voices
Technical
 Produced by Prince
 Photo: Afshin Shahidi
 Designer: Sam Jennings
 Recorded at Paisley Park Studios and 3121
 Engineered by Ian Boxill, L. Stu Young
 Assisted by Lisa Chamblee Hampton
 Mastered at Bernie Grundman Mastering

Charts

Weekly charts

Year-end charts

Certifications

References

External links
 3121 countdown and contest details
 

2006 albums
Prince (musician) albums
Albums produced by Prince (musician)
NPG Records albums
Universal Records albums